The ninth season of The Real Housewives of Beverly Hills, an American reality television series, aired on Bravo from February 12, 2019 to July 30, 2019, and is primarily filmed in Beverly Hills, California. 

The season focuses on the personal and professional lives of Kyle Richards, Lisa Vanderpump, Lisa Rinna, Erika Girardi, Dorit Kemsley, Teddi Mellencamp and Denise Richards. The season consisted of 24 episodes. 

This season marked the final appearance of original housewife Lisa Vanderpump.

The seasons executive producers are Andrew Hoegl, Barrie Bernstein, Lisa Shannon, Pam Healy and Andy Cohen.

Production and crew
The Real Housewives of Beverly Hills was renewed for a ninth season in April 2018. The season premiered on February 12, 2019. Alex Baskin, Chris Cullen, Douglas Ross, Greg Stewart, Toni Gallagher, Dave Rupel and Andy Cohen are recognized as the series' executive producers; it is produced and distributed by Evolution Media.

Cast
All six cast members from the previous season returned, along with Denise Richards joining the cast in a regular capacity. Grammer returned once again as a friend of the housewives. Vanderpump last appeared in the final episode of the season. On June 4, 2019, Vanderpump announced that she would not attend the ninth season reunion, stating: "The objective of the reunion is to reunite, right? And I have no inclination to reunite with the women who've been harassing me for 10 months now." Following this, Variety announced that she would not return to the series.

 Vanderpump did not attend this reunion.

Synopsis
Much of the season's drama revolves around a dog named Lucy Lucy Apple Juice that Dorit Kemsley adopts from Lisa Vanderpump's foundation, Vanderpump Dogs. Kemsley rehomes Lucy after the dog attacks her family, instead of returning it back to the foundation. However, the new owner was also unable to properly care for the dog and ended up taking Lucy to a kill shelter. When the story is leaked to Radar Online, the women unanimously believe that Vanderpump was behind it. Matters are further complicated when Teddi Mellencamp Arroyave confesses that she knew about the drama regarding Lucy and had conspired with two Vanderpump Dogs employees to create a scene for the show so they could embarrass Kemsley. Mellencamp Arroyave insists that Vanderpump was in on the scheme, but Vanderpump denies any involvement. The situation reaches a boiling point when Kyle Richards tells Vanderpump that the group, herself included, believes that Vanderpump orchestrated the plot to punish Kemsley for the dog fiasco. Vanderpump subsequently ends her friendship with Richards over the issue and quits the show, refusing to even attend the reunion.

Episodes

References

External Links

2019 American television seasons
Beverly Hills (season 9)